Brian Davies is a British emeritus professor of medical robotics at Imperial College London. He developed Probot, the first robotic device to operate upon a human being. Later, he developed the haptic based robotic assistant known as 'Acrobot', the first haptic based robot to be used in orthopaedic surgery. He is a Fellow of the Royal Academy of Engineering.

Career
Brian Davies began his career at Imperial College London in 1983. He completed his doctorate in medical robotics.

In 1987, working with urologist, John Wickham, Davies developed Probot, a robot for prostate surgery and in 1991 it was the first robotic device to operate upon a human being. By 1999, with orthopaedic surgeon Justin Cobb, he developed the robotic assistant known as 'Acrobot', the first haptic based robot to be used in orthopaedic surgery. In 1999 he co-founded the spinout ‘Acrobot’, which was later acquired by Stanmore Implants. In 2001 he was awarded a DSc.

He later developed the robot Sculptor, to assist surgeons in replacing knee joints.

Awards
In 2015, for his work into robots, he was awarded the life-time achievement award by the International Society of Technology in Arthroplasty (ISTA).

Selected publications

References 

Living people
English engineers
Date of birth unknown
British engineers
Academics of Imperial College London
Fellows of the Royal Academy of Engineering
Year of birth missing (living people)